Emmanuel is a village in Saint John Parish, Antigua and Barbuda.

Demographics 
Emmanuel has two enumeration districts.

 34201 Emmanuel_1
 34202 Emmanuel_2

Census Data (2011)

Individual

Household 
There are 145 households in Emmanuel.

References 

Populated places in Antigua and Barbuda
Saint John Parish, Antigua and Barbuda